Bird in a Silver Cage is an album by flautist Herbie Mann recorded in 1976 and released on the Atlantic Records label.

Reception

AllMusic site awarded the album 2 stars and its review by Jim Newsome states: "Another example of Herbie Mann's quest for new playing environments leading him to follow another trend, in this case the disco music coming out of Germany in the mid-to-late seventies".

Track listing 
 "Bird in a Silver Cage" (Sylvester Levay) – 12:51
 "Aria" (Dario Baldan Bembo, Sergio Bardotti) – 4:51
 "Fly, Robin, Fly" (Levay, Stephan Prager) – 1:06
 "Birdwalk" (Levay, Herbie Mann) – 7:34
 "Years of Love" (Levay) – 3:32
 "The Piper" (Mann) – 6:26

Personnel 
Herbie Mann – flute
Sylvester Levay – keyboards, arranger, conductor
Nick Woodland – guitar
Gary Unwin – bass
Martin Harrison – drums 
Elmer Louis, Joseph Spector – percussion
Jerry Rix – backing vocals
Penny McLean and the Munich Studio Choir – vocals (track 2)
Unidentified string section directed by Fritz Sonneleitner

References 

Herbie Mann albums
1976 albums
Atlantic Records albums